Bolton Wanderers Football Club (BWFC) is an English professional football club.

BWFC may also refer to the following clubs:

Bidvest Wits F.C., Johannesburg, South Africa 
Blidworth Welfare F.C., Nottinghamshire, England 
Boreham Wood F.C., Hertfordshire, England 
Bray Wanderers F.C., County Wicklow, Ireland

See also

BWAFC